Sonia Bashir Kabir is a technology investor focusing on tech startups in emerging markets of South Asia. Sonia began her career as a technology corporate professional and her journey led her to become a technology entrepreneur, an angel investor and a technology philanthropist. Sonia is currently the Founder of SBK Tech Ventures and SBK Foundation - her “Not for profit” entity which believes in empowering rural communities with Technology. “Tech Hubs” is an initiative of SBK Foundation.

Sonia has served as the Managing Director for Microsoft Bangladesh, Myanmar, Nepal, Bhutan and Laos, Country Director of Dell Bangladesh, Director Business Development for South East Asia, New Emerging Markets in Microsoft and Chief Operating Officer for Aamra Technologies Ltd. Former UN Secretary-General Ban Ki-moon appointed Sonia in 2015 to the Governing Council of the Technology Bank for the Least Developed Countries (LDC) for a three-year term. She was elected as Vice Chairman of UN Technology Bank in 2017.

Current UN Secretary General Antonio Guterres renewed Sonia's appointment  as Governing Council member and Sonia has been reappointed as Vice Chair of the UN Tech Bank for the 2019–2022 term.

Sonia is also a board member in UNESCO's Mahatma Gandhi Institute of Education for Peace and Sustainable Development. Sonia is the first woman to win the ICT Business Person of the Year Award from the Daily Star ICT Awards in 2019 and she was one of the 10 recipients of Microsoft Founder's Award in 2016 given by Bill Gates.

Sonia was recognized by UN Global Compact in 2017 as a SDG pioneer. 10 people globally got this recognition. She was recognized for integrating seven Global Goals into her business practices and strategies: no poverty; quality education; gender equality; decent work and economic growth; industry, innovation and infrastructure; reduced inequalities; creating partnerships to meet the Goals.

Sonia actively supports youth in technology and women empowerment with youth-led initiatives all over Bangladesh.

Early life and education
She completed her Senior Cambridge from Green Herald International School (St. Francis Xavier's) and Higher Secondary Certificate from Viqarunnisa Noon School and College. She lived in Silicon Valley, Northern California for 20 years where she was educated and trained. She has a Bachelor of Science (BS) degree from California State University, East Bay and a Master of Business Administration (MBA) from Santa Clara University.

Sonia was a Bangladeshi national athlete; she has played for Abahani women's Volleyball and Cricket team and continued playing for Bangladesh National Volleyball team.

Career
Sonia worked in Silicon Valley for Fortune 100 companies (Sun Microsystems & Oracle), startups & in the financial district. Her expertise include strategic planning & growth, sales execution, financial management, team building and change management.

Sonia served in the Boards of the American International School Dhaka, Bangladesh Employers Federation, Bangladesh Cricket Board (Women's Wing), Abahani Women's Games Development Committee and Women Entrepreneur's Association.

She currently has Board seats in IPDC Finance, BRAC University and Shakti Foundation for Disadvantaged Women. She is the Advisor for Federation of Bangladesh Chambers of Commerce and Industries (FBCCI), the apex trade organization of Bangladesh playing a pivotal role in consultative and advisory capacity, safeguarding the interest of the private sector in the country.

Sonia is the Founder of the 1st Women's IT Association in Bangladesh - Bangladesh Women in IT (BWIT) and the first Female Tech Investors Network (FTIN). She is also the Founder of The Angels Network (TAN) and the Founder President and a current Advisor of TiE Dhaka Chapter. TIE is a Silicon Valley headquartered not for profit association for fostering entrepreneurship.

Awards
 ICT Business Person of the Year Award from Daily Star, 2019 (first woman to win the award)
Microsoft Founder Award 
 SDG Pioneer Award, 2017 
 Anannya Top Ten Awards, 2016

References

External links

Year of birth missing (living people)
Living people
Women business executives
California State University, East Bay alumni
Santa Clara University alumni
Bangladeshi businesspeople
People from Dhaka